The Kaman K-MAX (company designation K-1200) is a helicopter with intermeshing rotors (synchropter) designed and produced by the American manufacturer Kaman Aircraft.

Developed during the 1980s and 1990s, the K-MAX builds on the work of the German aeronautical engineer Anton Flettner. Being a synchropter, it has greater efficiency in comparison to conventional rotor technology. In addition to airlifting external loads, specialised configurations for aerial firefighting and casualty evacuation have been developed. It was produced for both military and civilian operators.

Kaman sought to develop the K-MAX into an unmanned aerial vehicle with optional remote control. During the early 2010s, a pair of unmanned K-Maxes underwent an extended battlefield evaluation as a cargo UAV, for which purpose they were deployed to provide logistics support to United States Marine Corps (USMC) ground forces during the war in Afghanistan. Despite receiving numerous awards, the K-MAX was ultimately passed over by the USMC in favour of an unmanned version of the Boeing H-6U Little Bird. The company stated its intention to continue development and to seek out other customers for this capability. An optionally-piloted configuration, branded as the ’’K-Max Titan’’, underwent flight testing in 2021.

The initial production run of the K-MAX ran between 1991 and 2003, at which point the line was shuttered after the completion of 38 helicopters due to low customer demand. During June 2015, Kaman announced that it was restarting production following the receipt of ten commercial orders for the K-MAX. During May 2017, the first flight of a K-MAX built on the restarted production line took place; two months later, the first new-build aircraft since 2003 was delivered to a customer based in China. However, in January 2023, amid a downturn in demand, Kaman announced its intention to shutter production of the K-MAX once again.

Development

Background

In 1947, the German aeronautical engineer Anton Flettner was brought to the United States as part of Operation Paperclip. He was the developer of the two earlier synchropter designs from Germany during the Second World War: the Flettner Fl 265 which pioneered the synchropter layout, and the slightly later Flettner Fl 282 Kolibri ("Hummingbird"), intended for eventual production. Both designs used the principle of counter-rotating side-by-side intermeshing rotors, as the means to solve the problem of torque compensation, normally countered in single–rotor helicopters by a tail rotor, fenestron, NOTAR, or vented blower exhaust. Flettner remained in the United States and became the chief designer of the Kaman company. In this capacity, he designed numerous new helicopters that used the Flettner double rotor.

The K-MAX series is the latest in a long line of Kaman synchropters, the most famous of which is the HH-43 Huskie. The first turbine-powered helicopter was also a Kaman synchropter. Accordingly, the K-MAX relies on two primary advantages of synchropters over conventional helicopters: The increased efficiency compared to conventional rotor-lift technology; and the synchropter's natural tendency to hover. This increases stability, especially for precision work in placing suspended loads. At the same time, the synchropter is more responsive to pilot control inputs, making it possible to easily swing a load, or to scatter seed, chemicals, or water over a larger area.

The K-1200 K-MAX "aerial truck" is the world's first helicopter specifically designed, tested, and certified for repetitive external lift operations and vertical reference flight (Kaman received IFR Certification in 1999), an important feature for external load work. Other rotorcraft used for these tasks are adapted from general-purpose helicopters, or those intended to primarily carry passengers or internal cargo. The K-MAX can lift almost twice as much as the Bell 205 using a different version of the same engine. The aircraft's narrow, wedge-shaped profile and bulging side windows give the pilot a good view of the load looking out from either side of the aircraft.

The transmission has a reduction ratio of 24:1 in three stages, and is designed for unlimited life. The rotor blades (which turn in opposite directions) are built with a wooden spar and fiberglass trailing edge sections. Wood was chosen for its damage tolerance and fatigue resistance; and to take advantage of field experience and qualification data amassed from a similar spar on the HH-43 Huskie helicopter, built for the U.S. Air Force in the 1950s and 1960s. The pilot controls blade pitch with tubes running inside the mast and rotor blades to move servo flaps that pitch the blades, reducing required force and avoiding the added weight, cost and maintenance of hydraulic controls.

First termination of production
Between 1991 and 2003, thirty-eight K-MAX helicopters had been completed by Kaman. In 2003, amid a wider downturn that impacted the whole aviation industry, it was decided to shutter the production line. However, this move did not led to development work being halted; instead, such initiatives were continued for an extended period and new partners on the programme were sought.

Unmanned version
As early as 1998, Kaman was working on the development of an unmanned version of the K-MAX. During March 2007, Kaman and Lockheed Martin (Team K-MAX) signed a Strategic Relationship Agreement (SRA) to jointly pursue U.S. DoD opportunities. An unmanned mostly autonomously flying, optionally remote controlled and optionally piloted vehicle (OPV) version, the K-MAX Unmanned Multi-Mission Helicopter was developed for hazardous missions. It can be used in combat to deliver supplies to the battlefield, as well as civilian situations involving chemical, biological, or radiological hazards. A prototype of this was shown in 2008 for potential military heavy-lift resupply use, and again in 2010. In December 2010, the Naval Air Systems Command awarded a $46 million contract to Kaman for two aircraft, and, in 2011, they completed a five-day Quick Reaction Assessment. At the 2013 Paris Air Show, Kaman promoted the unmanned K-MAX to foreign buyers, the company claimed that several countries had expressed interest in the system.

During the mid-2010s, the unmanned K-MAX competed with the Boeing H-6U Little Bird to fulfil the Marine Corps unmanned lift/ISR requiment. In April 2014, Marines at Quantico announced they successfully landed an unmanned K-MAX, as well as a Little Bird, autonomously using a hand held mini-tablet. The helicopters were equipped with Autonomous Aerial Cargo/Utility System (AACUS) technology, which combines advanced algorithms with LIDAR and electro-optical/infrared sensors to enable a user to select a point to land the helicopter at an unprepared landing site. The Office of Naval Research selected Aurora Flight Sciences and the Unmanned Little Bird to complete development of the prototype AACUS system, however, Lockheed stated that it would continue to promote the K-MAX and develop autonomous cargo delivery systems.

Second production run
During February 2014, Kaman stated that it was looking into resuming K-MAX production, having recently received over 20 inquiries for firefighting, logging and industry transport requirements as well as requests for the military unmanned version. Ten firm orders convinced Kaman to put the design back into production again. By 2014, the K-MAX fleet had cumulatively flown 300,000 hours and cost $1,200 per flight hour to operate.

At Heli-Expo 2015 in Orlando, Kaman reported it continued toward reopening the production line. Kaman received deposits and the assembly line was restarted in January 2017. On May 12, 2017, Kaman test flew the first K-MAX from restarted production.

On July 13, 2017, the first new-build K-MAX since 2003 was delivered to Kaman's Chinese sales agent Lectern Aviation, which delivered it onwards to Guangdong Juxiang General Aviation, Guangdong Province for firefighting with the second to be delivered the following week. Due to production scheduling, Kaman needed to decide in 2017 whether to extend production beyond the first 10, and Kaman made the decision in June 2017 to produce a further 10 aircraft, reaching into at least 2019.

Building on a three-year autonomy experiment in Afghanistan with the US Marine Corps, Kaman was at one point pursuing development of the K-Max Titan, an optionally piloted variant intended for commercial customers to fly into dangerous zones like wildfires or natural disasters, and for long operation with no pilot rest; it was claimed to be suitable for operating for up to 100 flight hours before requiring any mandatory inspections. Following FAA certification, the system was to be fitted on new and used helicopters outside the factory. In April 2021, the Titan technology took its first flight.

On 18 January 2023, Kaman announced it will once again be ending the K-MAX production line later that year; its stated reasons for the closure were “low demand and variation in annual deliveries, coupled with low profitability and large working capital inventory requirements.” The line is scheduled to close in the first quarter of FY 2023 after completing a 60-platform production run. Kaman noted that it would take a $54 million of non-cash charges on account of write-downs of existing inventory and aircraft alike.

Operational history

During 2008, a single K-MAX was used for demolition work, having been outfitted with a  wrecking ball as a slung load.

In December 2011, an unmanned K-MAX was reported to be at work in Afghanistan. A third unmanned K-MAX in the U.S. was tested in 2012 to deliver cargo to a small homing beacon to achieve three-meter precision. By February 2013, the K-MAX had delivered  of cargo across 600 unmanned missions, during which in excess of 700 flight hours had been recorded.

On July 31, 2012, Lockheed announced a second service extension for the K-MAX in Afghanistan to support the Marine Corps; on 18 March 2013, the Marine Corps announced the indefinite extension of its use of the unmanned K-MAX helicopters, stating that it would keep the two aircraft in use "until otherwise directed". The unmanned K-MAX has won awards from Popular Science and Aviation Week & Space Technology, and was nominated for the 2012 Collier Trophy.

On June 5, 2013, one of the unmanned K-MAX helicopters crashed in Afghanistan while flying a resupply mission. No injuries occurred, the subsequent accident investigation ruled out both pilot error and mechanical issue, the rotorcraft having been flying autonomously towards a predetermined point and performing during the final stages of cargo delivery at the time. Operational flights of the remaining unmanned K-MAX were suspended following the crash, the Navy stating at that time that it could resume flying by late August. Early on, swing load was viewed as the crash's prime cause. The investigation determined that the crash had been caused by unexpected tailwinds that the helicopter experienced while making the delivery, instead of headwinds, which caused it to begin oscillating. Operators employed a weathervane effect to try to regain control, but its  load began to swing, which exacerbated the effect and caused it to contact the ground. The accident report determined that it could have been prevented if pilots intervened earlier and mission planners received updated weather reports; diverging conditions and insufficient programming meant it could not recover on its own and required human intervention.

The K-MAX supporting Marines in Afghanistan was planned to remain in use there until at least August 2014. The Marine Corps was looking into acquiring the unmanned K-MAX as a program of record, and the United States Army was also looking into it to determine cost-effectiveness. Hook-ups of equipment were performed in concert with individuals on the ground, however, Lockheed was looking into performing this action automatically through a device mounted atop the package that the helicopter can hook up to by itself; this feature was demonstrated in 2013. Other features were being examined, including the ability to be automatically re-routed in flight, and to fly in formation with other aircraft. The unmanned K-MAX was successfully able to deliver  of cargo in one day over the course of six missions (average  transported cargo per mission). Lockheed and Kaman discussed the purchasing of 16 helicopters with the Navy and Marine Corps for a baseline start to a program.

In May 2014, both of the unmanned K-MAX helicopters in use by the Marine Corps returned to the U.S., shortly after the Corps had determined that they were no longer needed to support missions in Afghanistan. After deploying in December 2011, originally planned for six months, they operated in the region for almost three years and lifted 2,250 tons of cargo. While the equipment entered storage, the service contemplated the possibility of turning the unmanned K-MAX from a proof-of-concept project into a program of record. Formal requirements for unmanned aerial cargo delivery are being written to address expected future threats, including electronic attack, cyber warfare, and effective hostile fire; these were avoided in Afghanistan quickly and cheaply by flying at night at high altitudes against an enemy with no signal degradation capabilities. Officials assessed the K-MAX helicopter that crashed and planned to repair it in 2015. The helicopters, ground control stations, and additional equipment are stored at Lockheed's facility in Owego. The two unmanned K-MAXs, designated CQ-24A, were to be moved to a Marine Corps base in Arizona by the end of September 2015 to develop tactics and operations concepts to inform an official program of record for a cargo UAV.

In March 2015, a casualty evacuation exercise was performed in coordination with an unmanned ground vehicle (UGV) and mission planning system. A medic launched the UGV to evaluate the casualty, used a tablet to call in and automatically land the K-MAX, then strapped a mannequin to a seat aboard the helicopter.

By January 2015, 11 K-MAX helicopters were reportedly no longer airworthy, some of which had been written off in accidents. Furthermore, an addition five were in storage at Kaman. By March 2015, the number of operational K-MAXs was reportedly 21.

Operators

 HeliQwest Aviation

 Colombian National Army Aviation

 Akagi Helicopter Co.

 Rotex Helicopter AG

 Skywork Helicopters Ltd.

 HELOG AG

 Central Copters, Inc.
 Columbia Basin Helicopters (1 on order)
 Helicopter Express
 HeliQwest International
 Mountain West Helicopters
 ROTAK Helicopter Services
 Swanson Group Aviation
 Timberline Helicopters, Inc.
 United States Marine Corps

Specifications (K-MAX)

See also

References

External links

 Kaman Aerospace's K-MAX page
 Superior Helicopter K-MAX with Firemax system
 Austrian Wucher Helikopter
 Economy of helilogging with K-MAX
 Video of a K-MAX starting up

K-MAX
1990s United States civil utility aircraft
1990s United States helicopters
Unmanned helicopters
Synchropters
Single-turbine helicopters
Aircraft first flown in 1991